TrustoCorp is an artist or a group of artists based in New York City. They are known for their humorous street signs and product labels, which can be found in New York City, San Francisco, San Diego, and Miami.

Internationally their signs have been seen in Newcastle-Upon-Tyne, United Kingdom.

References

Artists from New York (state)
American artist groups and collectives